The All Together is a 2007 comedy film written and directed by Gavin Claxton and starring Martin Freeman, Corey Johnson, Velibor Topic and Danny Dyer.

Plot
Frustrated TV producer Chris is a self-opinionated wannabe screenwriter (with a particular dislike of British films featuring quirky secondary characters and plastic gangsters) who is forced to leave his unreliable flatmate Bob in charge of showing a series of estate agents around the house he is trying to sell.  Worried by Bob's habit of spending all day "working" in the basement playing loud music, Chris asks his friend to listen out for the door bell and show anyone who comes calling inside.  Bob promises to do exactly that and for once, not to let him down.

Over the course of the day, whilst Chris struggles to cope with a loathsome colleague – back at the house it is soon clear that Bob is taking his promise to Chris rather too literally.  Bob has indeed, allowed anyone inside, including a couple of archetypal movie-style gangsters – an incompetent young Brit played by Danny Dyer and an incontinent American.

That evening, Chris is surprised to return home and find his flatmate, four estate agents, two Jehovah's Witnesses and a terrified children's entertainer being held hostage by a couple of characters straight out of a British gangster film.

Cast

Soundtrack
The film's soundtrack is made up of rare Northern soul tracks, including:

Tommy Neal – Going to a Happening
Doris Troy – I'd Do Anything
Johnny De'vigne – I Smell Trouble
Ronnie & Robyn – Sidra's Theme
The Channels – Anything You Do 
Doni Burdick – Open The Door To Your Heart
Steve Karmen – Breakaway
The Sapphires – Gotta Have Your Love
The Yum Yums – Gonna Be A Big Thing

Critical response
The All Together was panned by critics. On Rotten Tomatoes, the film has an approval rating of 0% based on 10 reviews.

See also
 Northern soul

References

External links
 

2007 comedy films
2007 films
British comedy films
2000s English-language films
2000s British films